The 1983 2. divisjon was a Norway's second-tier football league season.

The league was contested by 24 teams, divided into two groups; A and B. The winners of group A and B were promoted to the 1984 1. divisjon. The second placed teams met the 10th position finisher in the 1.divisjon in a qualification round where the winner was promoted to 1. divisjon. The bottom three teams inn both groups were relegated to the 3. divisjon.

Tables

Group A

Group B

Promotion play-offs

Results
Strindheim – Brann 0–0
Pors – Strindheim 1–2
Brann – Pors 1–1

Strindheim won the qualification round and was promoted to the 1984 1. divisjon.

Play-off table

References

Norwegian First Division seasons
1983 in Norwegian football
Norway
Norway